Alice Clausing is a former member of the Wisconsin State Senate.

Biography
Clausing was born on June 7, 1944, in Port Washington, Wisconsin. She graduated from Port Washington High School in 1962.  She is a graduate of the University of Wisconsin-Oshkosh and the University of Wisconsin-Stout. She was an educator and landlord of rental properties. She married Howard F. Clausing of Port Washington in 1966  and their two children were born in Port Washington.

Career
Clausing was first elected to the Senate in 1992. She would serve as a member from 1993 until 2001, after she was defeated for re-election in 2000 by Sheila Harsdorf. In 2004, Clausing was an unsuccessful candidate in the Democratic primary for her former Senate seat.

References

People from Port Washington, Wisconsin
Democratic Party Wisconsin state senators
Women state legislators in Wisconsin
University of Wisconsin–Oshkosh alumni
University of Wisconsin–Stout alumni
Businesspeople from Wisconsin
Educators from Wisconsin
American women educators
1944 births
Living people
21st-century American women